The 1916 United States presidential election in California took place on November 7, 1916 as part of the 1916 United States presidential election. State voters chose 13 representatives, or electors, to the Electoral College, who voted for president and vice president.

California narrowly voted for the Democratic incumbent, Woodrow Wilson, over the Republican nominee, Associate Justice Charles Evans Hughes.

Although very close, this was not as close as the previous election or the equally critical 1892 election in the Golden State, and was only the third-closest state in a thrilling election behind New Hampshire and Minnesota. Following on from breaking half-a-dozen county droughts in 1912, Wilson became the first Democrat to carry Santa Barbara County and Plumas County since Stephen A. Douglas in 1860, and the first to carry the counties of Santa Cruz and Placer since James Buchanan in 1856. Had Hughes won California, he would have won the election despite losing the popular vote. This is the last election in which a Republican candidate carried Los Angeles County but failed to carry the state of California. This is also the most recent election when California would decide the overall winner of a presidential election, despite routinely having among the highest, or highest number of electoral votes after the next reapportionment following the 1930 Census. Had Hughes carried the state, he would have been elected with 267 electoral votes to Wilson's 264.

Results

Results by county

References

California
1916
1916 California elections